Titanic is a 1953 American drama film directed by Jean Negulesco and starring Clifton Webb and Barbara Stanwyck.

It was the first Titanic film for 20th Century Fox, which also released the 1997 film of the same title internationally, while  Paramount Pictures handled the North American distribution.

Plot
At the last minute, Richard Sturges (Clifton Webb), a wealthy expatriate in Europe, offers a Basque emigrant money for his steerage-class ticket (the lowest class) for the maiden voyage of the RMS Titanic—and succeeds. Once aboard, he seeks out his runaway wife, Julia (Barbara Stanwyck). He discovers she is trying to take their two unsuspecting children, 18-year-old Annette (Audrey Dalton) and ten-year-old Norman (Harper Carter), to her hometown of Mackinac Island, Michigan, to rear them as down-to-earth Americans rather than rootless elitists like Richard himself.

As the ship is prepared for departure, the company representative suggests to captain Edward J. Smith (Brian Aherne) that a record-setting speedy passage would be welcomed.
 
Other passengers include Maude Young (based on real-life Titanic survivor Margaret "Molly" Brown), a wealthy woman of a working-class origin (Thelma Ritter); social-climbing Earl Meeker (Allyn Joslyn); a 20-year-old Purdue University tennis player, Gifford "Giff" Rogers (Robert Wagner); and George S. Healey (Richard Basehart), a Catholic priest who has been defrocked for alcoholism.

When Annette learns Julia's intentions, she insists on returning to Europe with Richard on the next ship as soon as they reach America. Julia concedes that Annette is old enough to make her own decisions, but she insists on keeping custody of Norman. This angers Richard, forcing Julia to reveal that Norman is not his son, but rather the result of a one-night stand after one of their many bitter arguments. Upon hearing that, he agrees to give up all claim to Norman. He joins Maude, Earl, and George Widener in the lounge to play auction bridge with them. The next morning, when Norman reminds him of a shuffleboard game they had arranged, he coldly brushes him off.

Meanwhile, Giff falls for Annette at first glance. At first she repulses his brash attempts to become better acquainted, but eventually warms to him. That night, Giff, Annette, and a group of young people sing and play the piano in the dining room, while Captain Smith watches from a corner table.

Second Officer Charles Lightoller (Edmund Purdom) expresses his concern to Captain Smith about the ship's speed when they receive two messages from other ships warning of iceberg sightings near their route. However, Smith assures him there is no danger.

That night, the lookout spots an iceberg dead ahead. The crew tries to steer clear of danger, but the ship is gashed below the waterline and begins taking on water. When Richard finds Captain Smith, he insists on being told the truth: The ship is doomed and there are not enough lifeboats for everyone on board. He tells his family to dress warmly but properly; then they head outside.

Richard and Julia have a tearful reconciliation on the boat deck, as he places her, Annette, and Norman into a lifeboat. Unnoticed by Julia, Norman gives up his seat to an older woman and goes looking for Richard. When one of the lines becomes tangled, preventing the boat from being lowered, Giff climbs down and fixes it, only to lose his grip and fall into the water. Unconscious but alive, he is dragged onto the boat.

Meeker disguises himself as a woman to board a lifeboat, but Maude Young notices his shoes and unmasks him in front of the others. At the other end of the spectrum of courage and unselfishness, George Healey heads down into one of the boiler rooms to comfort injured crewmen.

As the Titanic is in her final moments, Norman and Richard find each other. Richard tells a passing steward that Norman is his "son" and then tells Norman that he has been proud of him every day of his life. Then they join the rest of the doomed passengers and the crew in singing the hymn "Nearer, My God, to Thee".  As the last boiler explodes, the Titanics bow plunges, pivoting her stern high into the air while she rapidly slides into the icy water. As dawn approaches, the survivors are seen in the lifeboats, waiting for help to arrive.

Cast

Production

Development
Walter Reisch says Darryl F. Zanuck called him and Charles Brackett in and told them, "I have Clifton Webb under contract, and we have CinemaScope, and I now want to do something big...Don't make Clifton a clown. I want him to start a new career as a character actor. Use all the young people we have on the lot, like Audrey Dalton and Robert Wagner..."

Reisch says he came up with the Titanic idea and pitched Clifton Webb as one of the 25 multi-millionaires who died on it. He said the film would be "60 percent truth, completely documentary" drawing on real-life accounts. A part was written for Thelma Ritter. Reisch says it was Richard Breen's idea to have an alcoholic priest.

Brackett, who co-wrote and produced the film, told the press that some of the stories had to be discarded "because they are too fantastic for movie audiences to believe". At one point the film was going to be called Nearer My God to Thee.

Casting
In a September 1952 news article, it was reported that Terry Moore was set to play the role of Annette Sturges, on condition that she would finish production of Man on a Tightrope on time.

Critical reception
According to the film aggregator website, Rotten Tomatoes, the film holds a 91% "Fresh" rating, based on 10 reviews.

Variety reviewed the film positively stating, "but by the time the initial 45 or 50 minutes are out of the way, the impending disaster begins to take a firm grip on the imagination and builds a compelling expectancy".

Pauline Kael was not impressed with the picture's special effects.  She wrote: "the actual sinking looks like a nautical tragedy on the pond in Central Park".

It is generally considered by historians that Titanic contains abundant historical inaccuracies. For example, the maiden voyage was not sold out, but actually barely more than half-booked, as shown by White Star Line records of 1912. Linda Koldau writes: "Titanic experts rightly emphasize that the scene at Cherbourg is historical nonsense, since the Titanic was far from being sold out and an additional passenger would easily have been able to purchase a first-class ticket ...  Yet if one accepts that historical accuracy is not the point here, since the story is not at all that of the Titanic, it is a perfectly functioning script". Also, Carpathia had arrived at the scene at around 4:10 A.M., and started picking up the survivors before sunrise.  The rescue took several hours.  In addition, Captain Smith was not awake at the time of the ship's allision with the iceberg, as shown in the film, but was awakened immediately thereafter and summoned to the bridge.  Also, the wireless from the Caronia warning Titanic of an iceberg ahead of it on the steamer track, was never shown by the wireless operator Jack Phillips to the Captain or other officers, but in the film Phillips does show it to Captain Smith and First Officer Charles Lightoller, who then wonders in the film whether that is the same iceberg north of the steamer track previously warned of in a wireless from the Baltic, which Phillips had shown to his superior officers.

Awards and nominations
The film won the Academy Award for Best Original Screenplay, and was nominated for the Best Art Direction. The film was also nominated for the Directors Guild of America Award.

References

External links

 
 
 
 

1953 films
1950s disaster films
1950s historical films
1953 romantic drama films
American black-and-white films
American disaster films
American historical films
American romantic drama films
Films about RMS Titanic
American films based on actual events
Films directed by Jean Negulesco
Films produced by Charles Brackett
Films set in the 20th century
Films set in 1912
Films whose writer won the Best Original Screenplay Academy Award
Romantic period films
Seafaring films based on actual events
Films with screenplays by Charles Brackett
20th Century Fox films
Films scored by Sol Kaplan
1950s English-language films
1950s American films